Retilaskeya bicolor is a species of sea snail, a gastropod in the family Newtoniellidae, which is known from the Caribbean Sea and the Gulf of Mexico. It was described by C. B. Adams, in 1845.

Description 
The maximum recorded shell length is 20 mm.

Habitat 
The minimum recorded depth for this species is 0 m and the maximum recorded depth is 65 m.

References

Newtoniellidae
Gastropods described in 1896